Psittrichasiidae is a family of birds belonging to the superfamily of the true parrots (Psittacoidea). It is a very small family, the smallest of the three families of the true parrots. It is divided into two subfamilies: Psittrichasinae and Coracopsinae, that contain a single genus each. The first contains a single species, native to New Guinea, and the second contains four living species distributed throughout Madagascar and other islands of the Indian Ocean.

Genera
The family Psittrichasiidae contains two subfamilies:

Subfamily Psittrichasinae:
 Genus Psittrichas
 Psittrichas fulgidus - Pesquet's parrot

Subfamily Coracopsinae
 Genus Coracopsis
 Coracopsis barklyi - Seychelles black parrot
 Coracopsis nigra - Lesser vasa parrot
 Coracopsis vasa - Greater vasa parrot
 Coracopsis sibilans - Comoros black parrot (split from Coracopsis nigra)

Recent studies indicate that the extinct Mascarene parrot (Mascarinus mascarinus) was closely related to the members of Coracopsis.

References

Parrots
Taxa named by Hans von Boetticher